Kalitino is a rural locality (a village) in Prigorodnoye Rural Settlement, Sokolsky District, Vologda Oblast, Russia. The population was 5 as of 2002.

Geography 
Kalitino is located 15 km southeast of Sokol (the district's administrative centre) by road. Fedyukovo is the nearest rural locality.

References 

Rural localities in Sokolsky District, Vologda Oblast